Gordon Büch (born 25 October 1995) is a German footballer who plays for VSG Altglienicke.

References

1995 births
Footballers from Berlin
Living people
Association football defenders
German footballers
Tennis Borussia Berlin players
Hertha Zehlendorf players
FC Ingolstadt 04 players
FC Ingolstadt 04 II players
TSV Buchbach players
Hertha BSC II players
Racing FC Union Luxembourg players
VSG Altglienicke players
3. Liga players
Luxembourg National Division players
Regionalliga players
German expatriate footballers
Expatriate footballers in Luxembourg
German expatriate sportspeople in Luxembourg